Cristian Leonel Ramírez Zambrano (born 12 August 1994) is an Ecuadorian professional footballer who plays as a left-back for Krasnodar of the Russian Premier League. Fast, intelligent, ambidextrous and a great dribbler are the qualities of Ramirez which has led to the foreign press comparing him to Roberto Carlos.

Club career

Independiente Jose Teran
Having started out early with CSCyD Brasilia, he was signed in 2009 by Independiente Jose Teran. A promising young left-back, even as to being compared to the legendary Roberto Carlos, his professional debut came on 28 August 2011, against El Nacional, fully completing everyone's expectations of his abilities on-field, and started most of his 2011 Serie A games. Throughout the season, he was an incredible defender and attacker against the league's top teams, like LDU Quito, Deportivo Quito, and Barcelona SC. He also gained a fearsome reputation, having stopped on their tracks promising young Ecuadorian talents such as Fidel Martinez and Renato Ibarra; the latter being during Ramirez' debut.

Ramírez continued to play with the starting eleven for the 2012 season. After garnering so much international attention, he had trials with Borussia Dortmund, though he could not be signed by the club then due to UEFA rules restricting signage of foreign players under 18, and a 10-day trial with Harry Redknapp's Tottenham Hotspur, which began on 3 April 2012.

Fortuna Düsseldorf
On 25 January 2013, he signed for German Bundesliga club Fortuna Düsseldorf.

1. FC Nürnberg
On 17 June 2014, it was confirmed that Cristian would be loaned to Nürnberg for the 2014–2015 season.

Ferencváros
On 2 April 2016, Ramírez became Hungarian League champion with Ferencvárosi TC after losing to Debreceni VSC 2–1 at the Nagyerdei Stadion in the 2015–16 Nemzeti Bajnokság I season.

Krasnodar

On 9 January 2017, he signed a 4.5-year contract with the Russian Premier League club Krasnodar. On 20 February 2021, Krasnodar removed him from the official squad registered with the RPL for the rest of the 2020–21 season due to injury. On 15 May 2021, he extended the contract with Krasnodar to 30 June 2025. On 3 March 2022, following the Russian invasion of Ukraine, Krasnodar announced that his contract is suspended and he will not train with the team, but the contract is not terminated and remains valid.

Career statistics

Club

International career
Ramírez first played for Ecuador in the 2011 under-17 squad, who participated in the 2011 South American U-17 Football Championship, and just barely qualified for the 2011 FIFA U-17 World Cup. Ramírez showcased his footballing skills and mental capacity in the 2011 U-17 World Cup to successfully defend against the likes of Germany, Panama and Burkina Faso. It was in this tournament where he has instantly intrigued the international club scene. As of April 2012, he has been called up for the U-20 squad, to be able to participate in the 2013 U-20 tournaments.

Ramírez was called up for the friendly matches against Argentina and Honduras on 15 and 20 November 2013. He made his debut as a second-half substitute against Honduras.

International goals
Scores and results list Ecuador's goal tally first.

Honours
Ferencváros
Hungarian League: 2015–16
Hungarian Cup (2): 2014–15, 2015–16
Hungarian League Cup: 2014–15

Personal life
On 3 June 2021, he acquired citizenship of Russia after playing in the country for 4.5 years.

References

1994 births
People from Santo Domingo de los Colorados
Naturalised citizens of Russia
Ecuadorian emigrants to Russia
Living people
Ecuadorian footballers
Ecuador youth international footballers
Ecuador under-20 international footballers
Ecuador international footballers
Association football fullbacks
C.S.D. Independiente del Valle footballers
Fortuna Düsseldorf players
1. FC Nürnberg players
Ferencvárosi TC footballers
FC Krasnodar players
Ecuadorian Serie A players
2. Bundesliga players
Nemzeti Bajnokság I players
Russian Premier League players
Copa América Centenario players
2019 Copa América players
Ecuadorian expatriate footballers
Expatriate footballers in Germany
Ecuadorian expatriate sportspeople in Germany
Expatriate footballers in Hungary
Ecuadorian expatriate sportspeople in Hungary
Expatriate footballers in Russia
Ecuadorian expatriate sportspeople in Russia